Lambiya is a village in Jaitaran tehsil of Pali district in the Indian state of Rajasthan.

Geography
It has an average elevation of 310 metres (1020 feet).

Demographics
 India census, Lambiya had a population of 6,823. Males constitute 51% 3,471) of the population and females 49% (3,352).

References

Lambiya Geographic Location

Villages in Pali district